Peter Grant (5 April 1935 – 21 November 1995) was an English music manager, best known as the manager of Led Zeppelin from their creation in 1968 to their breakup in 1980. With his intimidating size and weight, confrontational manner, knowledge and experience, Grant was able to procure strong and unprecedented deals for Led Zeppelin, and is widely credited with improving pay and conditions for all musicians in dealings with concert promoters. Grant has been described as "one of the shrewdest and most ruthless managers in rock history".

Born and largely brought up in the south London suburb of South Norwood, England by his mother, he worked variously as a  stagehand,  bouncer,  wrestler, bit-part actor, and UK tour manager for acts such as Chuck Berry, Gene Vincent and the Animals, before getting involved briefly in band management with the Nashville Teens and the Yardbirds.

He was also a record executive for Swan Song Records.

Early life 
Grant was born in the south London suburb of South Norwood, England. His mother Dorothy worked as a secretary. He attended Sir Walter St John School in Grayshott before the Second World War, and completed his schooling at Charterhouse School in Godalming after the evacuation. After the war, Grant returned to Norwood until leaving at the age of 13, when he became a sheet metal factory worker in Croydon. He left that job after a few weeks, and then obtained employment on Fleet Street delivering photographs for Reuters.

Grant was soon attracted to the entertainment industry, and worked as a stagehand for the Croydon Empire Theatre until 1953, when he was called up for national service in the RAOC, reaching the rank of corporal. He worked briefly as an entertainment manager at a hotel in Jersey before being employed as a bouncer and doorman at London's 2i's Coffee Bar, where Cliff Richard, Adam Faith, Tommy Steele and others got their start. Co-owner of the 2i's bar, professional wrestler Paul Lincoln, suggested and assisted Grant appear on television as a wrestler under the titles "Count Massimo" and "Count Bruno Alassio of Milan," using his 6 ft 2 in frame to good effect. This kindled his enthusiasm for acting, and he was hired by film studios as a bit part actor, stuntman and body double.

Acting career 
Between 1958 and 1963, Grant appeared in a number of films, including A Night to Remember (1958), playing a crew member on the Titanic; The Guns of Navarone (1961), playing a British commando; and Cleopatra (1963), playing a palace guard. He also appeared in television shows such as The Saint, Crackerjack, Dixon of Dock Green, and The Benny Hill Show. He was Robert Morley's double on many of the actor's films. The money he made from these ventures was invested in his own entertainment transport business. As the acting roles dried up, Grant made more money taking groups such as the Shadows to their concerts.

Artist management 
In 1963, Grant was hired by promoter Don Arden along with John Schatt to be the British tour manager for artists such as Bo Diddley, the Everly Brothers, Little Richard, Brian Hyland, Chuck Berry, Gene Vincent and the Animals. By 1964, Grant had started to manage his own acts including the Nashville Teens, an all-girl group called She Trinity, the New Vaudeville Band, The Jeff Beck Group, Terry Reid and Stone the Crows. His management was established in the same 155 Oxford Street office used by his friend, record producer Mickie Most, who had previously worked with Grant at the 2i's Coffee Bar. Most and Grant together set up RAK Music Management, an offshoot of Most's Rak Records.

In late 1966, Simon Napier-Bell asked Grant to take over management of the Yardbirds, who were constantly touring yet struggling financially. Mickie Most had suggested to Napier-Bell that Grant would be an asset to the Yardbirds, but as it happened his arrival was too late to save the band. The experience, however, did give him ideas which were put to good use later with Led Zeppelin. As he explained:

Grant's no-nonsense approach to promoters, and his persuasive presence, were influential in the Yardbirds making money from concerts for the first time. Grant travelled closely with the Yardbirds, ensuring that all costs were kept to a minimum, that members were paid on time, and that the band retained artistic control. Unlike most other managers at the time who rarely set foot in a music venue, Grant's approach was hands-on.

Led Zeppelin 

The Yardbirds dissolved in 1968, all band members departing except guitarist Jimmy Page, who constructed a new group consisting of himself, Robert Plant, John Bonham and John Paul Jones to fulfil a contractual agreement to tour Europe, and were allowed by the other Yardbird members to use the name "The New Yardbirds". After the tour, the agreement to use the name expired, and Chris Dreja wrote Page a "cease and desist" notice, so the group chose the name Led Zeppelin, with Grant assuming the role of their manager. His trust in and loyalty to Led Zeppelin was such that his managerial arrangement with the band was via a gentlemen's agreement.

It is doubtful whether Led Zeppelin would have been as successful without Grant as their manager. He negotiated the group's sizeable five-year record contract with Atlantic Records, and his business philosophy would eventually pay off for the label. Grant strongly believed that bands could make more money, and have more artistic merit, by focusing their efforts on albums rather than singles. Live performances were deemed more important than television appearances – if one wanted to see Led Zeppelin, one had to experience their performances in person.

Led Zeppelin's particular success in the United States can partly be credited to Grant's keen sense of US audiences and the vast underground movement that was sweeping the country. It was his knowledge of the American touring scene that thrust Led Zeppelin into the forefront of the burgeoning American rock market, and under his stewardship the great majority of Led Zeppelin concerts were performed in the United States, resulting in massive profits for the group. He ensured that the vast bulk of ticket profits wound up in the hands of the band rather than in the hands of promoters and booking agents, and is reported to have secured 90% of gate money from concerts performed by the band, an unprecedented feat. By taking this approach he set a new standard for artist management, "single-handedly pioneer[ing] the shift of power from the agents and promoters to the artists and management themselves."

Grant's determination to protect the financial interests of Led Zeppelin was also reflected by the sometimes extraordinary measures he took to combat the practice of unauthorized live bootleg recordings. He is reported to have visited record stores in London that were selling Led Zeppelin bootlegs and demanded all copies be handed over. He also monitored the crowd at Led Zeppelin concerts in order to locate anything which resembled bootleg recording equipment. At one concert at Vancouver in 1971, he saw what he thought was such equipment on the floor of the venue and ensured that it was destroyed, only to later learn that it was a noise pollution unit being operated by city officials to test the volume of the concert. On another occasion, at the Bath Festival in 1970, he threw a bucket of water over unauthorised recording equipment.

Grant had complete and unwavering faith in Led Zeppelin. Unlike some other managers of the era, he never compromised his clients by exploiting them for short-term profit, instead always putting their interests first, and being a manager that split the profits five ways, between Grant and the other members of the band. This was demonstrated by his decision to never release the popular songs from Led Zeppelin's albums as singles in the UK, out of respect for the band's desire to develop the concept of album-oriented rock. As was explained by Jones:

Grant's past experience in handling stars such as Jerry Lee Lewis and Gene Vincent also provided him with an excellent grounding in managing the pandemonium which frequently surrounded Led Zeppelin, particularly whilst the band was on tour. Grant himself said that "Led Zeppelin looks after the music and I do everything else – and if it takes some strong measures to get our way, then so be it." According to rock journalist Steven Rosen:

Although there were media reports of his heavy-handed, intimidating tactics, Grant was respected in the business. Jones said, "Peter was a very sensitive man. He was a very, very smart man. People just think of his size and his reputation, but actually he never had to use his size. He could out-talk anybody ..."

Grant was instrumental in setting up Led Zeppelin's publishing company, Superhype Music in 1968. He was also the driving force in establishing Swan Song Records in 1974, which gave Led Zeppelin further financial and artistic control over its products. Although initially he solely managed Led Zeppelin, in later years he additionally assumed management of other bands signed to Swan Song, such as Stone the Crows, Bad Company and Maggie Bell. In 1975, he turned down a lucrative offer to manage Queen. When he was once questioned on what was the single most important thing a manager could say, Grant's response was "Know when to say 'no'." In 1977, he was asked by Colonel Tom Parker to manage a proposed concert tour of Europe by Elvis Presley, but Elvis died on 16 August 1977, just as negotiations had commenced.

Mr Zeppelin Regrets 
In January 1972, Bernard Chevry, manager of the Midem music business festival wrote to Grant, asking for "Led Zeppelin and his backing group" to appear. Grant was annoyed that Chevry did not realise Led Zeppelin was a group, and in response took out a full-page advertisement in the trade paper Record Retailer, showing the original Midem letter, captioned "Mr Zeppelin Regrets. ... ." The response was seen by most of the music industry, and humiliated Chevry. Grant later described Chevry as "a prat".

Oakland incident 
In 1977, Grant gave his approval for Led Zeppelin's tour manager Richard Cole to hire John Bindon to act as security co-ordinator for the band's concert tour of the United States. Bindon had previously provided security for actors Ryan and Tatum O'Neal.

Towards the end of the tour, a major incident occurred during their first concert at the Oakland Coliseum on 23 July 1977. Upon arrival at the stadium, it was alleged that Bindon pushed a member of promoter Bill Graham's stage crew out of the way as the band entered the stadium via a backstage ramp. Tension had been simmering between Graham's staff and Led Zeppelin's security team during the day, and as Grant and Bindon were walking down the ramp near the end of the concert, words were exchanged with stage crew chief Jim Downey, which resulted in Bindon knocking Downey unconscious.

Within minutes, a separate off-stage incident involving Graham's security man Jim Matzorkis, who allegedly slapped Grant's 11-year-old son Warren over the removal of a dressing room sign, escalated into an all-out brawl that resulted in Matzorkis being taken to hospital after being beaten by Grant and Bindon. The band, except John Bonham, were performing on stage and were unaware of what was transpiring backstage. Led Zeppelin's second Oakland show took place only after Bill Graham signed a letter of indemnification absolving Led Zeppelin from responsibility for the previous night's incident. However, Graham refused to honour the letter because, according to his legal advice, he was under no obligation to agree to its terms.

Members of the band returned to their hotel after the concert, and were woken the next morning by a surprise police raid after Graham had changed his mind and decided to press charges. Bindon, Cole, Grant and Bonham received bail and travelled to New Orleans on 26 July, but the remaining dates on the tour were subsequently cancelled due to the sudden death of Robert Plant's son, Karac, back home in the UK. As they returned to Britain, a suit was filed against them by Graham for $2 million.

After months of legal wrangling, Led Zeppelin offered to settle and all four pleaded nolo contendere, receiving suspended sentences and undisclosed fines. Bindon had already been dismissed by the band upon their return to Britain. Grant later stated that allowing Bindon to be hired was the biggest mistake he ever made as manager.

Final years 

Marital problems, diabetes, cocaine addiction and the death of Led Zeppelin drummer John Bonham all took their toll on Grant's health, and after the official breakup of Led Zeppelin in 1980, and the subsequent folding of the Swan Song label in 1983, he virtually retired from the music business to his private estate in Hellingly, East Sussex.

However, towards the end of his life he conquered his addiction and lost a significant amount of weight. His first public appearance for many years was in 1989, when he and Jimmy Page both attended a Frank Sinatra concert at the Royal Albert Hall. Grant subsequently sold his estate and moved to nearby Eastbourne, where he was offered the civic position of local magistrate for the town council, but he turned it down. In 1992, he appeared in the film Carry On Columbus as a cardinal. In his remaining years, Grant became a keynote speaker at music management conferences such as In the City, where he was lauded by latter-day peers.

Death 
On the afternoon of 21 November 1995, Grant suffered a fatal heart attack while driving to his home at Eastbourne with his daughter Helen. He was 60 years old.

Grant was buried on 4 December 1995 at the cemetery opposite his mansion, with the funeral service held at St Peter and St Paul's Church, Hailsham, East Sussex. His eulogy was read by longtime friend Alan Callan. Coincidentally, it was the 15th anniversary of Led Zeppelin's official breakup. His final public appearance had been at the final night of the Page and Plant tour at the Wembley Arena in July 1995.

Grant was survived by his son Warren Grant and his daughter Helen Grant.

Tributes and accolades 
Grant has been widely recognised for improving pay and conditions for musicians in dealings with concert promoters. According to music journalist Mat Snow, "Peter Grant enjoys a proud position in the pantheon of legendary British rock managers."  He has also been stated as "the most colourful and influential manager in the history of rock." Phil Everly, from the Everly Brothers, noted: "Without his efforts, musicians had no careers. He was the first to make sure the artists came first and that we got paid and paid properly."

Chris Dreja, whom Grant had managed whilst he was with the Yardbirds, recalls:

Similarly, Page has described Grant as groundbreaking in his style of management, explaining that "Peter had changed the dynamic that existed between bands, managers and promoters. He was a superb, canny manager."

In 1996, the MMF (Music Managers Forum) award for outstanding achievement in management was renamed the Peter Grant Award, in his honour.

Filmography 
A Night to Remember (1958) – Titanic Crew Member (uncredited)
The Guns of Navarone (1961) – British Commando (uncredited)
Cleopatra (1963) – Palace Guard (uncredited)
The Song Remains the Same (1976) – Himself – Band Manager
Carry On Columbus (1992) – Cardinal (uncredited final film role)

Television appearances 
The Saint (1962)
Crackerjack (1962)
Dixon of Dock Green (1962)
The Benny Hill Show (1962)

References 

Sources

External links 

1935 births
1995 deaths
Burials in England
20th-century English male actors
English male film actors
English music managers
Led Zeppelin
People educated at Charterhouse School
People from South Norwood
Royal Army Ordnance Corps soldiers
Swan Song Records
People from Hellingly
20th-century English businesspeople
20th-century British Army personnel
Military personnel from London